Eduardo Frei may refer to either of two presidents of Chile:

Eduardo Frei Montalva (1911–1982), Chilean political figure and president of Chile from 1964 to 1970
Eduardo Frei Ruiz-Tagle (born 1942), Chilean politician and civil engineer, president of Chile from 1994 to 2000, son of the above

See also
Frey (surname)
Base Presidente Eduardo Frei Montalva, an Antarctic base of Chile